atmosph3re is a locally hosted music streaming web app that allows users to manage and stream music files that are part of their personal music collection, over Wi-Fi, Ethernet, or the Internet.

Overview 
atmosph3re is a web app; it runs inside a web browser. Firefox, Microsoft Edge, Google Chrome and Safari are currently supported. atmosph3re is installed locally on a home computer that will act as a web streaming server to deliver music over a network. It is, thus, an on-premises media streaming app that distinguishes itself from conventional streaming music services, where users do not own any of the albums. atmosph3re installs on Windows machines, but can be accessed from any platform with a web browser. It is bundled with the Apache HTTP Server, and the MySQL database server and uses a music player written in JavaScript, called jPlayer, to play music in the browser. Default playback is done in HTML5 if possible, reverting to Adobe Flash player in other circumstances. atmosph3re can also launch music in an external music player.

atmosph3re scans all folders containing music and generates an album-based digital library; it manages music albums, not individual songs. It searches through music by release date, style, appreciation, name and number of plays or in alphabetical order. Direct queries by artist or album names are also supported. These are the means by which one can build a digital music library. Listening history for all albums and by all users is saved. atmosph3re requires user authentication to allow access to music. Multiple users can access one instance of atmosph3re. User access is differentiated, meaning that multiple users can each see a different part of one big music collection.

atmosph3re is built on the Bootstrap (front-end framework), thus conforming to responsive web design guidelines.

atmosph3re is a commercial app, licensed on a per-installation basis.

History 

atmosph3re has been in continuous development by Guillaume Carrier, from Turbine Interactive (Montreal, Canada), since 2005. Initially developed in 2005 to answer Turbine Interactive's internal needs, atmosph3re has been created to manage and stream individual music collections.

See also 

 Comparison of streaming media systems
 Comparison of on-demand streaming music services
 List of streaming media systems

References

External links
 

Streaming media systems
Media servers
Windows media players
Web applications